José Gorostiza Alcalá (10 November 1901 – 16 March 1973) was a Mexican poet, educator, and diplomat.

Biography
José Gorostiza was born in the riverine city of Villahermosa, then known as San Juan Bautista, to Celestino Gorostiza and Elvira Alcalá de Gorostiza. He was a descendant of the Spanish playwright Manuel Eduardo de Gorostiza. His younger brother Celestino would also become an important artist. He moved to Mexico City to attend the National Preparatory School and later the Colegio Francés de Mascarones. After graduating from the Universidad Nacional Autónoma de México, he worked first as a professor at his alma mater and then at the National School of Teachers in 1932.

After teaching followed a series of important administrative jobs in the government: head of the Department of Fine Arts at the Secretariat of Public Education (1932-1935) and head of the Department of Publicity at the Secretariat of Foreign Relations (1935-1937). Subsequently, he served in various diplomatic and ambassadorial capacities, including: Director General of Political Affairs at the Secretariat of Foreign Relations, Director General of the Diplomatic Service (Secretariat of Foreign Relations) (1944), Ambassador to Greece (1950-1951), Secretary of Foreign Relations (1964), and head of the National Commission of Nuclear Energy (1965-1970).

Literary endeavors
His literary output, though sparse, was rich in content. His first book of poetry,  (Songs to Sing on Boats), appeared in 1925. After a lull of fourteen years came what is considered his masterpiece,  (Death without End). In 1964, he published  (Poetry), a collection of his previously published work plus a section dedicated to unfinished pieces called  (Of the Frustrated Poem). In 1969, he published a book of essays titled  (Prose).

On March 22, 1955, he became a numerary member of the same and held seat 25. He died, aged 71, in Mexico City.

Awards
 National Prize for Arts and Sciences (Premio Nacional de Ciencias y Artes) (1968)
 Grand Decoration of Honour in Silver with Sash for Services to the Republic of Austria (1958)

Selected published works
 , 1925
 , 1939
 , 1964
 , 1969
 .
 .

See also

References

Bibliography
 Camp, Roderic Ai, Mexican political biographies, 1935-1993. The Hague: Mouton, 1993.
 Cortés, Eladio, Dictionary of Mexican Literature. Westport, CT: Greenwood Press, 1992.
  Xirau, Ramón, . Mexico: Ant. Libr. Robredo, 1955.

External links
 
  
  

1901 births
1973 deaths
Writers from Tabasco
People from Villahermosa
Ambassadors of Mexico to Greece
Institutional Revolutionary Party politicians
Members of the Mexican Academy of Language
Mexican educators
20th-century Mexican poets
Mexican male poets
20th-century Mexican male writers
Mexican people of Basque descent
National Autonomous University of Mexico alumni
Academic staff of the National Autonomous University of Mexico
Recipients of the Grand Decoration with Sash for Services to the Republic of Austria
Grand Crosses with Star and Sash of the Order of Merit of the Federal Republic of Germany